Jordan Pierre-Charles (born 26 November 1993) is a French professional footballer who plays as a defender.

Club career
After making his semi-professional debut in the French lower divisions, Pierre-Charles joined full professional team AC Ajaccio in May 2016. He made his professional debut in the following weeks, in a 0–0 Ligue 2 draw against Tours.

In June 2017, Pierre-Charles signed a two-year contract with Ligue 2 Valenciennes. Six months later, the arrival of Saliou Ciss spelled the end of his Valenciennes career, and he joined Bourg-en-Bresse on an 18-month deal. He joined AS Lyon-Duchère in July 2019, at the end of his Bourg-en-Bresse contract. Lyon-Duchère rebranded as Sporting Club Lyon in June 2020.

In June 2021, he moved to Chambly in Championnat National.

On 2 July 2022, Pierre-Charles signed with Stade Briochin.

International career
Pierre-Charles was born in mainland France and is of Martiniquais descent. He was called up to the Martinique national team for 2022–23 CONCACAF Nations League matches in June 2022.

References

External links

Jordan Pierre-Charles foot-national.com Profile

1993 births
People from Levallois-Perret
Footballers from Hauts-de-Seine
French people of Martiniquais descent
Living people
Association football defenders
French footballers
Amiens SC players
SR Colmar players
AC Ajaccio players
Valenciennes FC players
Football Bourg-en-Bresse Péronnas 01 players
Lyon La Duchère players
FC Chambly Oise players
Stade Briochin players
Ligue 2 players
Championnat National players
Championnat National 3 players